Level 10 is the highest level in the USA Gymnastics Junior Olympics Program. The level is open to women's artistic, men's artistic, trampoline, acrobatic and rhythmic gymnasts.

Age Requirements

Women's Artistic 
Gymnasts must have reached their 9th birthday to qualify to Level 10.

Men's Artistic 
Male artistic competitors must have reached their 16th birthday to qualify.

Rhythmic 
Level 10 can only be achieved by qualifying for the U.S. National Championship.  A rhythmic gymnast may start competing at Level 5 when she has reached her 6th birthday, and Level 6 when she has reached her 7th birthday.

Trampoline & Tumbling 
For T&T gymnasts, there is no age requirement. In Gymnastics they will have an age requirement for levels 2,3.

Acrobatic 
There is no age requirement for acrobatic gymnasts.

Competitions 
Competitions, or "meets," as they are known, are held throughout the year but primarily during the Level 10 artistic season, which is from January to April. Clubs usually host a meet through those months on behalf of their Booster Club.

Women's & Men's Artistic 
Regular competitions that are hosted throughout the Level 10 season include the following;

Rhythmic
Regular Rhythmic competitions include;

Acro
Regular acrobatic competitions include;

Trampoline
Regular Trampoline competitions include;

J.O. Nationals 
The Junior Olympic National Championships and Junior Olympic National Invitational Tournament are the highest levels of competition in the women's and men's artistic program. The highest level of competition is the J.O. Nationals. Gymnasts qualify to the competitions through their Regional Championships. There are eight age divisions (Junior A-D and Senior A-D), and the youngest age of qualification is 9 years old.

Gymnasts compete for their region and are eligible to win individual all-around and event titles, as well as team medals.

Notable Level 10 Gymnasts 
Here is a list of Notable Level 10 gymnasts.

Women's Artistic 
 Alexis Beucler - Former International Elite
 Mackenzie Brannan - 2014 Nastia Liukin Cup co-champion
 Kacy Catanzaro – Towson Tigers gymnast (2009–12), American Ninja Warrior
 McKenna Kelley - 2014 Nastia Liukin Cup co-champion
 Alex McMurtry - 2013 Nastia Liukin Cup champion, Florida Gators gymnast (2015–18)
 Melissa Metcalf
 Katelyn Ohashi – 2013 American Cup gold medalist, UCLA gymnast (2016–19)

References

Gymnastics in the United States